Maple Island is an unincorporated community in May Township, Washington County, Minnesota, United States.  The community is located west-southwest of Marine on St. Croix near the junction of May Avenue and 155th Street North.

Nearby places include Marine on St. Croix, Scandia, Hugo, and Stillwater.

References

Unincorporated communities in Minnesota
Unincorporated communities in Washington County, Minnesota